Chris Evert-Lloyd defeated Hana Mandlíková in the final, 5–7, 6–1, 6–1 to win the women's singles tennis title at the 1980 US Open. It was her fifth US Open title and her eleventh major singles title overall.

Tracy Austin was the defending champion, but lost in the semifinals to Evert in a rematch of the previous year's final.

Seeds
The seeded players are listed below. Chris Evert is the champion; others show the round in which they were eliminated.

  Tracy Austin (semifinalist)
  Martina Navratilova (fourth round)
  Chris Evert (champion)
  Evonne Goolagong (withdrew before the tournament began because of a back injury)
  Wendy Turnbull (third round)
  Dianne Fromholtz (fourth round)
  Greer Stevens (first round)
  Andrea Jaeger (semifinalist)
  Hana Mandlíková (runner-up)
  Virginia Ruzici (fourth round)
  Kathy Jordan (fourth round)
  Virginia Wade (third round)
  Pam Shriver (quarterfinalist)
  Ivanna Madruga (quarterfinalist)
  Betty Stöve (first round)
  Regina Maršíková (second round)

Qualifying

Draw

Key
 Q = Qualifier
 WC = Wild card
 LL = Lucky loser
 r = Retired

Finals

Earlier rounds

Section 1

Section 2

Section 3

Section 4

Section 5

Section 6

Section 7

Section 8

External links
1980 US Open – Women's draws and results at the International Tennis Federation

Women's Singles
US Open (tennis) by year – Women's singles
1980 in women's tennis
1980 in American women's sports